Peter William Thomson  (23 August 1929 – 20 June 2018) was an Australian professional golfer. He won the Open Championship five times between 1954 and 1965. Thomson is the only golfer in the modern era to win a major three times in succession – The Open in 1954, 1955 and 1956.

Life
Thomson was born in Brunswick, a northern suburb of Melbourne, Australia. His Open Championship wins came in 1954, 1955, 1956, 1958, and 1965. He was the only man to win the tournament for three consecutive years in the 20th century.

Thomson was a prolific tournament champion around the world, winning the national championships of ten countries, including the New Zealand Open nine times. He competed on the PGA Tour in 1953 and 1954 with relatively little success (finishing 44th and 25th on the money list), and after that was an infrequent competitor. However, in 1956, playing in just eight events, he won the rich Texas International Open, and achieved his best finish in one of the three majors staged in the United States (fourth at the U.S. Open), to finish ninth on the money list.

In the era that Thomson won his first four Open Championships, few of the leading professionals from the United States travelled to Britain to play in that event. At that time, the prize money in the Open was insufficient for an American to cover their expenses. However, Thomson demonstrated with his win in 1965 that he could beat a field of the world's best players, as that victory came against a field that included Arnold Palmer, Jack Nicklaus and Tony Lema, three of the top four American golfers from the 1964 money list.

Thomson enjoyed a successful senior career. In 1985 he won nine times on the Senior PGA Tour in the United States, and finished top of the money list. His last tournament victory came at the 1988 British PGA Seniors Championship. He was president of the Australian PGA from 1962 to 1994 and a victorious non-playing captain of the international team in the 1998 Presidents Cup.

He was inducted into the World Golf Hall of Fame in 1988 and the Sport Australia Hall of Fame in 1985.

Thomson was active as a golf writer, contributing to The Age of Melbourne for some 50 years from the early 1950s. His local club was Victoria Golf Club. He was an honorary member of Royal Melbourne Golf Club. Thomson designed over a hundred golf courses in Australia and around the world.

Death
Thomson died in Melbourne on 20 June 2018 after a four-year battle with Parkinson's disease, at the age of 88.

Amateur wins
1947 Australasian Foursomes Shield (with Dick Payne)
1948 Victorian Amateur Championship

Professional wins (98)

PGA Tour wins (6)

PGA Tour playoff record (2–0)

European Tour wins (1)

Japan Golf Tour wins (1)

*Note: The 1976 Pepsi-Wilson Tournament was shortened to 54 holes due to rain.

Japan Golf Tour playoff record (1–0)

PGA Tour of Australasia wins (1)

Other European wins (28)

Other Australia and New Zealand wins (45)
1949 Victorian Close Championship
1950 New Zealand Open
1951 Australian Open, New Zealand Open, Victorian Close Championship
1952 Victorian PGA Championship, Mobilco Tournament
1953 New Zealand Open, New Zealand PGA Championship, Victorian PGA Championship
1954 Ampol Tournament (Nov)
1955 Wiseman's Tournament, New Zealand Open, Caltex Tournament, Pelaco Tournament, Speedo Tournament
1956 Pelaco Tournament
1958 Victorian Open, Pelaco Tournament
1959 New Zealand Open, Pelaco Tournament, Coles Tournament, Caltex Tournament
1960 New Zealand Open, Wills Classic
1961 New Zealand Open, Adelaide Advertiser Tournament, New South Wales Open
1963 Lakes Open, Metalcraft Tournament (tie with Ted Ball)
1964 Forest Products Tournament
1965 New Zealand Open, Metalcraft Tournament, Caltex Tournament, BP Tournament (tie with Kel Nagle)
1966 New Zealand Wills Masters (tie with Tim Woolbank), Caltex Tournament (tie with Kel Nagle)
1967 Caltex Tournament (tie with Bob Charles), Australian PGA Championship, Australian Open
1968 South Australian Open, Victorian Open, Sax Altman Tournament (tie with Guy Wolstenholme)
1971 New Zealand Open
1972 Australian Open

Asia Golf Circuit wins (5)
1962 Yomiuri International
1964 Philippine Open
1965 Hong Kong Open
1967 Hong Kong Open
1976 Indian Open

Other Japan wins (5)
1969 Chunichi Crowns
1971 Dunlop Tournament, Wizard Tournament
1972 Chunichi Crowns, Pepsi Tournament

Other wins (4)
1952 Mills Round Robin (South Africa)
1960 Hong Kong Open
1964 Indian Open
1966 Indian Open

Senior PGA Tour wins (11)

Senior PGA Tour playoff record (0–1)

Other senior wins (1)

Major championships

Wins (5)

1Defeated Dave Thomas in 36-hole playoff; Thomson (139), Thomas (143)

Results timeline

Note: Thomson never played in the PGA Championship.

CUT = missed the halfway cut (3rd round cut in 1975 and 1984 Open Championships)
DQ = disqualified
"T" indicates a tie for a place.

Summary

Most consecutive cuts made – 10 (1954 Open Championship – 1958 Open Championship)
Longest streak of top-10s – 4 (1955 Open Championship – 1957 Masters)

Champions Tour major championships

Wins (1)

a This was the December edition of the tournament.

Team appearances
Amateur
Australian Men's Interstate Teams Matches (representing Victoria): 1948 (winners)

Professional
World Cup (representing Australia): 1953, 1954 (winners), 1955, 1956, 1957, 1959 (winners), 1960, 1961, 1962, 1965, 1969
Lakes International Cup (representing Australia): 1952
Slazenger Trophy (representing British Commonwealth and Empire): 1956
Presidents Cup (representing International): 1996 (non-playing captain), 1998 (non-playing captain, winners), 2000 (non-playing captain)
Hopkins Trophy (representing Canada): 1952
Vicars Shield (representing Victoria): 1951 (winners), 1952 (winners), 1953 (winners)

Honours
 1955 – ABC Sportsman of the Year
1 January 1957 – Appointed Member of the Order of the British Empire (MBE) in recognition of his services to Australia in the sporting and international sphere.
31 December 1979 – Appointed Commander of the Order of the British Empire (CBE) for service to the sport of golf
10 December 1985 – inaugural member of Sport Australia Hall of Fame
1988 – elected to World Golf Hall of Fame
1997 – the inaugural Peter Thomson Trophy, an annual contested between the eight Melbourne Sandbelt golf clubs
1 January 2001 – Awarded the Centenary Medal
2001 – elevated to Legend in the Sport Australia Hall of Fame
11 June 2001 – Officer of the Order of Australia (AO)
2011 – Victorian Golf Industry Hall of Fame 2
2016 – inducted as inaugural Immortal of the PGA of Australia

See also
List of golfers with most PGA Tour Champions wins
List of golfers with most wins in one PGA Tour event
List of men's major championships winning golfers

References

External links

Golflegends.org profile

Australian male golfers
PGA Tour of Australasia golfers
Golf course architects
European Tour golfers
PGA Tour Champions golfers
Winners of men's major golf championships
Winners of senior major golf championships
World Golf Hall of Fame inductees
Sport Australia Hall of Fame inductees
Golf writers and broadcasters
Officers of the Order of Australia
Australian Commanders of the Order of the British Empire
Recipients of the Centenary Medal
Golfers from Melbourne
People from Brunswick, Victoria
Neurological disease deaths in Victoria (Australia)
Deaths from Parkinson's disease
1929 births
2018 deaths